Morgan Parker (born December 19, 1987) is an American poet, novelist, and editor. She is the author of poetry collections Other People’s Comfort Keeps Me Up At Night (Switchback Books, 2015), There are More Beautiful Things than Beyoncé (Tin House Books, 2017), and Magical Negro (Tin House Books, 2019), which won the National Book Critics Circle Award. She is also author of the young adult novel, Who Put This Song On (Delacorte Press, 2019).

Education
Parker completed her bachelor's degree in anthropology and creative writing at Columbia University and her MFA in poetry at New York University.

Career
Parker previously served as editor at Amazon Publishing's Little A and Day One. She has taught creative writing at Columbia University, co-curates the Poets With Attitude (PWA) reading series with Tommy Pico, is the creator and host of Reparations, Live! at the Ace Hotel in New York, and is a member of The Other Black Girl Collective with poet and performer Angel Nafis.

Her poetry has been featured in publications including The Awl, Poetry Foundation, Tin House, and others. Her work was also included in Why I Am Not A Painter (Argos Books), The BreakBeat Poets: New American Poetry in the Age of Hip-Hop, Black Girl Magic: The BreakBeat Poets Vol. 2 and Best American Poetry 2016.

In December 2015, she was Poetry Foundation's featured blogger.

Other People’s Comfort Keeps Me Up At Night, Switchback Books, 2015 
Other People's Comfort Keeps Me Up At Night was Parker's debut collection, published in 2015, was rereleased in both the UK and US in 2021. In an interview with the London Review Bookshop upon the book rerelease, Parker discusses and reflects on her art with Rachel Long. In this they also discuss the importance of spoken word and humor, where Parker's boldness gives the poems a life beyond the page, weaving between humor, pathos and collapses the distinction between the personal and political.

The rerelease opens with an introduction by Danez Smith:Morgan Parker knows we are looking. You could say Morgan Parker considers audience; I say she peeps game. She knows on the other side of the poem is another person, their being, their ways, their looking. These pages become screens for Parker to set the conditions of that witnessing, to set a control for the wildness of lyric and living captured in this collection. (Are they Morgan. Kinda. Yes. Maybe. No. And.) find themselves dreaming up Real World audition tapes, giving Real Housewives confessions, launching urgent and prayer-filled questions at Miss Black America. They know we're watching. Morgan knows. She looks back.

Personal life
Parker was born and raised in Southern California before attending school in New York. She moved back to Southern California in 2017.

Awards and honors
 2012 Cave Canem Fellowship
 2013 Gatewood Prize
 2016 Pushcart Prize
 2017 National Endowment of the Arts Literature Fellowship
 2019 National Book Critics Circle Award (Poetry) for Magical Negro

Bibliography and work
A partial list of Parker's publications

 Other People’s Comfort Keeps Me Up At Night, Switchback Books, 2015
 There Are More Beautiful Things Than Beyoncé, Tin House Books, 2017
 Magical Negro, Tin House Books, 2019
 Who Put This Song On?, Delacorte Press, 2019

Cover Art 
Cover art for the first edition of Other People's Comfort Keeps Me Up At Night features an adaptation of work by Sam Vernon. The first U.S. edition of There Are More Beautiful Things Than Beyoncé features commissioned artwork by Mickalene Thomas. The second edition features the photo Portrait of a Woman Fallen from Grace, 1987 by Carrie Mae Weems.

Further works 
Parker also writes essays and articles in between publishing her books and poetry.

References

External links

 Official website

African-American poets
Living people
21st-century American poets
21st-century American women writers
Columbia College (New York) alumni
1987 births
21st-century African-American women writers
21st-century African-American writers
20th-century African-American people
20th-century African-American women
New York University alumni